Inge André Olsen (born January 21, 1978) is a retired Norwegian footballer who last played for Stabæk. Olsen came to the club from Start in 1998.

In his second season with Stabæk, the then-Norway U21 international attracted interest from English clubs Leeds United and Wimbledon. A transfer to Wimbledon seemed likely, but it fell through after Olsen was tackled by Heiðar Helguson in a league match and sustained a broken tibia and fibula.

In Stabæk's return season to the Tippeliga in 2006, Olsen was one of the most important player for his team, and was linked to one of the favourites to win the league, Brann from Bergen. The move never materialized. Olsen was loaned out from Stabæk in both 2007 and 2008.
In November 2011, Olsen along with Truls Haakonsen were charged as part of a police investigation into the Veigar Páll Gunnarsson transfer 2011, but acquitted in court.

Olsen was the director of sports at Stabæk from 2010. In December 2019 it was announced that the upcoming transfer window was his last as chief of Stabæk's player logistics, and that he would become director of sports at Danish club AaB in April 2020.

Honours 
Stabæk
 Norwegian Cup: 1998
 Eliteserien: 2008

References

1978 births
Living people
People from Søgne
Norwegian footballers
Norway youth international footballers
Norway under-21 international footballers
IK Start players
Stabæk Fotball players
Strømsgodset Toppfotball players
Eliteserien players
Norwegian First Division players
Association football defenders
Stabæk Fotball non-playing staff
AaB Fodbold non-playing staff
Norwegian expatriate sportspeople in Denmark